The Burra was an electoral district of the House of Assembly in the Australian state of South Australia from 1862 to 1875.

The Burra was also the name of an electoral district of the unicameral South Australian Legislative Council from 1851 until its abolition in 1857, George Strickland Kingston being the member. 
It was created in 1862 after the Electoral district of The Burra and Clare was abolished.

In February 1875 The Burra was abolished and superseded by the Electoral district of Burra, Rowland Rees being one of the last members for the old district and one of the two new members for the new.

The town of Burra is currently located in the safe Liberal seat of Stuart.

Members

References 

Former electoral districts of South Australia
1862 establishments in Australia
1875 disestablishments in Australia